House to House Heart to Heart (HTH) is a monthly American magazine.  HTH is a customizable, 8 page, color, Christian magazine that works exclusively with Churches of Christ.  The publication is printed every month for a total of 12 issues a year and is directly mailed into homes.  Each issue contains gospel lessons and biblical stories. HTH is printed in English, French, Korean, and Spanish.

HTH is under the oversight of the elders at the East Ridge Church of Christ in Chattanooga, Tennessee.  Allen Webster is the managing editor.  Luke Griffin is Director of Operations. Matt Wallin is Director of Promotions.

History
HTH started in 1994 with one congregation mailing out 1,000 copies.  The editors are currently working with 4,100 congregations to send out around 2,500,000 copies into households each issue.

Circulation

The magazine has an online archive with the text for every article published. https://www.housetohouse.com/print-archives/ The articles are indexed by volume and issue number.

References
 https://christianchronicle.org/house-to-house-tops-200-million-copies/
 https://christianchronicle.org/across-nation-dads-n-lads-retreat-house-house-milestone-quick-takes/
 https://www.annistonstar.com/free/a-map-a--mile-drive-and-relationships-born-in/article_a57a2032-3aaa-11e8-927f-9f692eba4a59.html
 https://christianchronicle.org/tornado-causes-significant-damage-to-ministry-offices
 http://www.oc.edu/good-news/story/house_to_house_heart_to_heart_nearing_three_million_circulation
 http://brotherhoodnews.com/2017/12/10/hth-monthly/
 http://brotherhoodnews.com/2017/07/08/hth-record-3-2-mil/

External links
House to House.com - The official website of House to House Heart to Heart
Polishing the Pulpit - Website of the Polishing the Pulpit conference that is organized by House to House

1994 establishments in Alabama
Monthly magazines published in the United States
Religious magazines published in the United States
Christian magazines
Churches of Christ
French-language magazines
Magazines established in 1994
Magazines published in Alabama
Mass media in Birmingham, Alabama
Spanish-language magazines